Tina is a genus of tropical trees in the family Sapindaceae, native to the eastern coast of Madagascar.

Selected species

References

Sapindaceae
Sapindaceae genera